was a 19th- to 20th-century Japanese martial artist. There have been claims that Yoshida was a member of the Kokuryukai,  Amur River Society (also known as the Black Dragon Society), an ultra-nationalist organization of disenfranchised ex-samurai who promulgated "pan-Asiatic ascendancy" in line with the rise of Japanese imperialism. Others have asserted that he was a member of the Genyosha (the "Dark Ocean Society'), a previous organization founded by Toyama Mitsuru. However, the membership roles of both of these organizations are meticulously documented, and Yoshida's name does not show up in the registry of either the Genyosha or the Kokuryukai.  Therefore, although it is quite likely that Yoshida had right-wing, nationalist leanings, he was not a significant figure in the major nationalist organizations of the late Meiji and Taisho periods.

While by all accounts a prolific martial artist and teacher, there is little surviving documentation of Yoshida's life that has been translated into English. Because he was known to have lived an extremely ascetic lifestyle, and possibly as a result of his political activities and connections, most information on Yoshida today has been passed down through oral transmission by primary sources.

At a young age, Yoshida apprenticed himself to Takeda Sōkaku, head of the Daitō-ryū Aiki-jūjutsu school, which would soon become popular throughout Japan as part of the public revitalization of the martial arts. Yoshida would become one of Sōkaku's top students, and he is in fact credited with introducing Morihei Ueshiba, founder of Aikido, to Sōkaku.

References

Registry of membership of the Genyosha - http://www5e.biglobe.ne.jp/~isitaki/index.html

Japanese jujutsuka
1883 births
1966 deaths